Bedfellows may refer to:

 "Bedfellows", an episode of Rocko's Modern Life
 "Bedfellows" (Law & Order: Criminal Intent), an episode of Criminal Intent
 "Bedfellows" (The Unit), an episode of the television series The Unit

See also 

 Strange bedfellows (disambiguation)